Eliseo Sala (2 January 1813–24 June 1879) was an Italian painter.

Sala was born in Milan, and a student between 1832 and 1838 at the Brera Academy under Luigi Sabatelli. He went to Venice and then in Rome, where he arrived in 1840 and became friends with Francesco Coghetti. He was not only a dedicated artist of genre paintings and historical subjects, but especially in painting realistic portraits in which he excelled and had a good reputation. Many of his works are preserved in several national museums including the Modern Art Gallery and the Pinacoteca di Brera, both in Milan. Sala died in Triuggio on 24 June 1879.

Sources
Eliseo Sala Brief Bio 
Works of Eliseo Sala 
Works of Eliseo Sala

1813 births
1879 deaths
Painters from Milan
19th-century Italian painters
Italian male painters
19th-century Italian male artists